Malkia Amala Devich-Cyril (born May 2, 1974) is a poet and media activist best known for spearheading national grassroots efforts of the Net Neutrality campaign, framing the discourse on protecting net neutrality as shifting away from the notion of "media democracy" and instead as a case of "media justice." They are the executive director of the Center for Media Justice, and a co-founder of the Media Action Grassroots Network.

Devich-Cyril's writings on media activism frequently appear in national publications such as Politico, the Huffington Post, and The Guardian Creative writing, including poetry and short-stories, have been published in anthologies such as Afrekete: An Anthology of Black Lesbian Writing, Aloud: Voices from the Nuyorican Poets Café, and In the Tradition: An Anthology of Young Black Writers.

Devich-Cyril was the spouse of comedian and editor Alana Devich-Cyril, and child of Janet Cyril, an activist in the Black Panther Party. Born and raised in the Bedford-Stuyvesant neighborhood of Brooklyn, New York, Cyril learned to read at the Liberation Bookstore in Harlem. They refer to growing up in the party as "in and of itself a blessing."

Training
Rockwood Leadership Institute Fellow
The Root 100

References

External links
Biography on the website of the Center for Media Justice

Living people
American LGBT writers
LGBT African Americans
1974 births
21st-century American poets
Internet activists
People from Bedford–Stuyvesant, Brooklyn
Sarah Lawrence College alumni
21st-century African-American writers